Augochlora is a genus of sweat bee with over 100 species  found across the Nearctic and Neotropic zones.  There are at least 110 described species in Augochlora.

See also
 List of Augochlora species

References

Halictidae
Bee genera